Burton Elementary School District is a public school district based in Tulare County, California.

References

External links
 

School districts in Tulare County, California